Green snake or Greensnake or Green Snake may refer to:

Snakes
Opheodrys, a genus of colubrid snakes from North America
Smooth green snake (Opheodrys vernali)
Rough green snake (Opheodrys aestivus)
Ptyas, a genus of colubrid snakes from Asia
Greater green snake (Ptyas major)
Sakashima green snake (Ptyas herminae)
Doria's green snake (Ptyas doriae)
Ptyas nigromarginata or green rat snake
Gonyosoma, a genus of colubrid snakes from Asia
Green trinket snake (Gonyosoma prasinum)
Ahaetulla, a genus of colubrid snakes from Asia
Malayan green whipsnake (Ahaetulla mycterizans)
Sri Lankan green vine snake (Ahaetulla nasuta)
Green whip snake (Hierophis viridiflavus), a species of colubrid snakes from Europe
Oxybelis fulgidus or  green vine snake, a species of colubrid snakes from Central and South America

Others
Xiaoqing (character), a fictional snake from the Chinese legend Madam White Snake
Green Snake (1993 film), a Hong Kong film starring Maggie Cheung as Xiaoqing
Green Snake (2021 film), a Chinese computer animation fantasy film
The Green Snake and the Beautiful Lily, a German fairy tale by Johann Wolfgang von Goethe
Chorokbaem Media ("Green Snake Media"), a Korean drama and animation company

Animal common name disambiguation pages